Conflict resolution is any reduction in the severity of a conflict. It may involve conflict management, in which the parties continue the conflict but adopt less extreme tactics; settlement, in which they reach agreement on enough issues that the conflict stops; or removal of the underlying causes of the conflict. The latter is sometimes called "resolution", in a narrower sense of the term that will not be used in this article. Settlements sometimes end a conflict for good, but when there are deeper issues – such as value clashes among people who must work together, distressed relationships, or mistreated members of one's ethnic group across a border – settlements are often temporary.

Unproductive conflict communication cycle
Unproductive conflict; this can be done by analyzing the three stages executed during this type of communication: the early stage, the middle stage, and the later stage. An argument's potential is determined within the first 3 minutes of exchange, setting the tone for the early stage. It is in this stage where cross-complaining becomes present – countering one's complaint with another complaint – a negative environment is immediately set and hostility is likely to be mirrored. Exiting the early stage and entering the middle stage, we can see the kitchen-sinking concept come into, "Once a negative climate has been set, it is stoked by other unconstructive communication. People often engage in kitchen-sinking, in which everything except the kitchen sink is thrown into the argument" (Wood 234).  Constant interruptions, underdeveloped thoughts and the continuation of cross-complaining is apparent, leaving no time, breath or desire to form resolutions. Eventually, the conflict floats into the later stage. By this stage participants are exhausted from arguing and individual prosperity is emphasized over mutual solution; counterproposals are exchanged.

Constructive conflict communication
Similar to the unproductive conflict communication cycle, the constructive conflict communication cycle can be divided into the same 3 parts – early stage, middle stage and later stage. To establish a positive early stage, it is crucial to acknowledge and confirm one another's concerns. Critical listening, open-mindedness and respect create a supportive climate. Once the solid groundwork is set, participants can shift into the middle stage and begin agenda building, that is, clarifying the concerns while staying on topic; interruptions are kept at a minimum and recognition is reinforced. Last but not least, solutions will be proposed as the conflict enters the later stage, where respect shall be maintained, ideas are exchanged, and resolutions are formed. Contrary to a negative climate, this form of communication seeks to create a positive, more tolerable environment.

Negotiation research

Negotiation, the most heavily researched approach to conflict resolution, has mainly been studied in laboratory experiments, in which undergraduate participants are randomly assigned to conditions. These studies have mostly looked at antecedents of the strategies adopted by negotiators and the outcomes attained, including whether agreement is reached, the joint benefit to both parties, and the individual benefit to each party.

Research in business and management have also studied conflict resolution through interviews, secondary data—such as legal files about buyer-supplier disputes—or case studies.

Negotiation research findings

Here are some of the more prominent findings from these studies (see Pruitt & Carnevale, 1993):

 Problem solving behavior, such as giving or requesting information about a party's priorities among the issues, encourages high joint benefit. 
 Contentious behavior, such as making threats or standing firm on one's proposals, encourages failure to reach agreement or,  if agreement is reached, low joint benefit. 
 Conceding makes agreement more likely but favors the other party's interests. 
 Prosocial motivation (resulting, for example, from positive mood or the expectation of future interaction with the other party) encourages problem solving and high joint benefit and discourages contentious behavior, but only when resistance to yielding is high (De Dreu, Weingart, & Kwon, 2000). 
 The party who makes the first offer tends to achieve greater benefit than the other party. 
 Three states of mind discourage concession making: viewing concessions as producing loss rather than as foregoing gain; focusing attention on one's goal rather than one's limit (i.e., the alternative that is minimally tolerable); and adopting a fixed-pie perspective, in which one views the other's gain as one's loss, rather than an expandable pie perspective. 
 Adopting any of the states of mind above diminishes the likelihood of agreement; but if agreement is reached, it increases the likelihood of winning, especially if the other party adopts the opposite state of mind (Thompson, Neale, & Sinaceur, 2004).
The type of conflict resolution method that is adopted will be influenced by the structure of the agreements. In particular, the level of detail of the contracts affects the choice on conflict resolution approach. This effect depends on the degree of coordination required in the relationship. The contractual structure also affects the influence of cooperative relational experience on negotiation strategy.

Cultural differences shown in research findings

Recent experiments have found cultural differences in negotiation behavior (Gelfand & Brett, 2004):

 Negotiators from individualistic cultures tend to take a more contentious approach, while those from collectivistic cultures are more concerned about maintaining positive relationships and hence more likely to cooperate (concede or engage in problem solving). 
 Accountability to constituents encourages contentious behavior for individualists, it encourages cooperative behavior for collectivists. 
 Research tells us that people with a high need for closure (for rapid decision making) tend to think and act in accustomed ways. It follows that high need for closure should accentuate contentious behavior in individualistic societies and cooperative behavior in collectivistic societies, an hypothesis that has received support.

Research into third party involvement

Third parties often become involved in conflict resolution, either being called in by the disputants or acting on their own because the conflict annoys them or the community they serve. Two common forms of third-party intervention are arbitration and mediation. In arbitration, the third party listens to both sides and then renders a decision, which can be either binding or advisory. Most mediation consists of third-party assistance with negotiation. When conflict is severe and the disputants have difficulty talking calmly with each other, mediators can put them into contact and help them develop a cease-fire or settlement. If the disputants cannot or will not meet each other, mediators commonly become intermediaries and shuttle between them. Sometimes a chain of two intermediaries is necessary because there is no single individual who can communicate effectively with both sides.

Mediation research findings

Mediation has been studied in both the laboratory and the field. Research (see Kressel & Pruitt, 1989) suggests that:

 Interpersonal mediation is usually successful in producing settlements. 
 Disputants generally prefer mediation over arbitration, since it allows them to retain control over the final decision. This means that in med-arb, where failure to reach agreement in mediation is followed by binding arbitration, disputants will work harder to reach agreement than in straight mediation. 
 In the case of small claims disputes, that mediation produces more compliance with the agreement than adjudication (a form of arbitration), perhaps because mediated decisions accord more with the parties' needs.
 To be fully successful, mediators must be seen as impartial between the two parties. 
 Having stronger initial ties to one side than the other is less damaging to the perception of impartiality than exhibiting bias during the mediation session. 
 Disputants even sometimes prefer that the mediator be close to the other party so that he or she can exert influence over that party.

Mediator tactics discoveries

More than 100 distinct mediator tactics have been identified. Among the tactics that have been shown to work well, in the sense of producing long-lasting agreements beneficial to both sides are:

 Helping the parties to understand each other's positions, challenging them to come up with new ideas, and requesting their reactions to new ideas. 
 When conflict is severe, mediators often have to be quite active and even pushy (e.g., telling disputants that their demands are unrealistic) in order to achieve agreement. 
 When conflict is less intense, and the disputants are capable of talking productively with each other, it is best for mediators to be relatively inactive.
 When disputant discussions are unproductive it is best to separate the parties ("caucusing") and engage in problem solving with each of them. 
 Compliance to the terms of an agreement is enhanced when the parties emerge from the mediation with a positive relationship and when they view the mediation process as a fair one in which all of the issues came out. 
 Continued third-party attention to the conflict has been found to encourage compliance to agreements reached at the end of internal war (Hampson, 1996).
 When there is a continuing relationship between disputants, helping them find a settlement for their current disagreement is often not enough. New conflicts may arise or deeper issues resurface. 
 Within the specific continuing relationship of marriage, marital therapists have found that training both the parties in problem solving skills, such as effective communication, identifying key issues, developing solutions that satisfy both parties' needs, helps ease marital problems. Two evaluation studies have shown the value of this approach, and one of them (Johnson & Greenberg, 1985) has demonstrated that emotionally focused therapy is even more effective. 
 Emotionally focused therapy is the practice where, persistent maladaptive interaction patterns are identified, and husband and wife are encouraged to reveal the feelings and needs associated with these patterns and to "accept and respond to" their partner's feelings and needs. 
 Programs have also been developed for training school children in problem solving skills, and evaluations of these programs have generally been quite positive. 
 In addition, many school systems have adopted peer mediation programs, in which students are trained to mediate conflicts that arise in their school. Evaluations of these programs have also been quite positive (Coleman & Deutsch, 2001).

Ethno-political conflict research

Investigators have looked at the impact of several kinds of third-party interventions in international and ethno-political conflict, including peacekeeping, mediation, and problem solving workshops. Peacekeeping is the use of lightly armed troops to manage conflict in a war zone. Most peacekeeping has been done by the United Nations, drawing on the military forces of its members. Traditional peacekeeping involved enforcing ceasefires, but in the last few years, the peacekeeper's duties have grown to include such services as the delivery of humanitarian aid, the supervision of elections, and maintenance of law and order. Research shows that as they go about these new responsibilities, peacekeepers – officers more so than enlisted men – often become heavily involved in negotiation and mediation. One study found that as conflict becomes more severe, peacekeeper mediators are more likely to meet separately with the disputants, to urge the disputants to relax, and to rely on force (Wall, Druckman, & Diehl, 2002).

Peacekeeping research findings

Peacekeeper mediation is done at the local level. Mediation at the intergovernmental level is a much older practice that has recently come under study with statistical analyses of large samples of historical mediations (Bercovitch & Houston, 2000). Among the findings in this research are:

 Mediation is more likely to be successful when the parties are of equal power, when they have been friendly in the past, when there have been relatively few fatalities in the period before mediation, when the mediator is of high rank, and when mediation comes after a test of strength between the parties. 
 The latter finding is compatible with ripeness theory (Zartman, 2000), which was developed from comparative case studies of violent ethno-political conflicts. This theory holds that two conditions are necessary for disputants to enter into and move forward in negotiation, bilateral or mediated: (a) both sides perceive that they are in a hurting stalemate, and (b) both sides develop optimism about the outcome of mediation—a "perceived way out."

Putting conflict research to use

Several types of negotiation strategies have been developed for repairing faulty international and inter-group relations. Negotiations are usually held over a period of several days, and attended by mid-level opinion leaders and decision makers from both sides of a conflict, under the leadership of scholar and/or practitioners. The aims of these workshops are to teach the parties about conflict in general and their conflict in particular, to forge understanding between the parties and, if possible, to develop joint projects that will contribute to reconciliation. One evaluation study conducted showed that these workshops improved attitudes toward the other side, increase complexity of thinking about the conflict, and facilitate further communication with people on the other side (Fisher, 1997). There is also evidence that some alumni of these workshops have later contributed to high level negotiations between the conflicting parties.

See also
Alternative dispute resolution 
Best alternative to a negotiated agreement
Conflict continuum
Cost of conflict
Dispute resolution 
Dispute Systems Design
Game theory 
Negotiation theory 
Peace and conflict studies
Search for Common Ground

References

External links
 City University of New York Dispute Resolution Consortium (CUNY DRC)
 Kelman, H.C., International Conflict and Conflict Resolution Research Papers
 Billikopf, Gregorio. Mediation of Interpersonal Conflict - Use of Pre-Caucus - University of California Party-Directed Mediation
 Party-Directed Mediation: Facilitating Dialogue Between Individuals'' by Gregorio Billikopf, free complete book download, from Internet Archive (3rd Edition, multiple file formats including PDF, EPUB, and others)
 International Journal of Conflict Management 
Handbook of Management Scales: Conflict resolution
UN Peacemaker, United Nations
Uppsala Conflict Data Program's Peace Agreement Dataset v. 2.0, 1975-2011

Bibliography

 
 Coleman, P., & Deutsch, M. (2001). Introducing cooperation and conflict resolution into schools: A systems approach. In D. J. Christie, R. V. Wagner, & D. D. N. Winter, Peace, conflict and violence: Peace psychology for the 21st century (pp. 223–239). Upper Saddle River, NJ: Prentice-Hall.
 
 Fisher, R. J. (1997). Interactive conflict resolution. Syracuse, NY: Syracuse University Press.
 Gelfand, M. J., & Brett, J. M. (Eds.) (2004), The handbook of negotiation and culture. Stanford, CA: Stanford Business Books.
 Hampson, F. O, (1996). Nurturing peace: Why peace settlements succeed or fail. Washington, DC: United States Institute of Peace Press.
 
 Kressel, K., & Pruitt, D. G. (1989). Conclusion: A research perspective on the mediation of social conflict. In Kressel, K., Pruitt, D. G., & Associates, Mediation research (pp. 394–435). San Francisco, CA: Jossey-Bass.
 Pruitt, D. G., & Carnevale, P. J. (1993). Negotiation in social conflict. Buckingham, England: Open University Press.
 Posthuma, R. A., Dworkin, J. B., & Swift, M. S. (2000).  Arbitrator Acceptability: Does Justice Matter?  Industrial Relations, 39, 313-335.
 Posthuma, R. A., Dworkin, J. B., Swift, M. S. (2002). Mediator Tactics and Sources of Conflict: Facilitating and Inhibiting Effects.  Industrial Relations, 41, 94-109.
 Thompson, L., Neale, M., & Sinaceur, M. (2004). The evolution of cognition and biases in negotiation research: An examination of cognition, social perception, motivation, and emotion. In M. J. Gelfand & J. M. Brett (Eds.) (2004), The handbook of negotiation and culture (pp. 7–44). Stanford, CA: Stanford Business Books.
 Wall, J. A., Druckman, D., & Diehl, P. F. (2002), Mediation by international peacekeepers. In J. Bercovitch (Ed.) (2002). Studies in international mediation (pp. 141–164). Basingstoke, England: Palgrave-Macmillan.
 Zartman, I. W. (2000). Ripeness: The hurting stalemate and beyond. In P. C. Stern & D. Druckman (Eds.), International conflict resolution after the Cold War. Washington, DC: National Academy Press.

Conflict (process)
Research
Dispute resolution